Baliochila pseudofragilis is a butterfly in the family Lycaenidae. It is found in northern Tanzania. Its habitat consists of forest margins and open patches in forests at altitudes between 1,400 and 1,800 metres.

References

Butterflies described in 1976
Poritiinae
Endemic fauna of Tanzania
Butterflies of Africa